''Haplochromis'' sp. 'rainbow sheller' is a species of fish in the family Cichlidae. It is found in Kenya and Tanzania.

References

Haplochromis
Undescribed vertebrate species
Taxonomy articles created by Polbot